Eslamabad (also Romanized as Eslāmābād; also known as Gāv Kadeh and Kāvak Deh) is a village in Kasma Rural District, in the Central District of Sowme'eh Sara County, Gilan Province, Iran. At the 2006 census, its population was 364, in 100 families.

References 

Populated places in Sowme'eh Sara County